is a private university in Maebashi, Gunma, Japan. The predecessor of the school was founded in 1449. The school has a secondary campus located in Fujioka, Gunma

Academics and research
 Faculty of Social Welfare / Department of Social Welfare
 Social Welfare Course
 Welfare Psychology Course
 School Education Course
 Child Welfare Course
 Elementary Education Course

 Faculty of Nursing / Department of Nursing
 Faculty of Rehabilitation / Department of Rehabilitation
 Physical Therapy Course
 Occupational Therapy Course
 Junior College / (two-year course) Department of Nursing Care
 Nursing Care Welfare Course
 Care Worker Practice Course
 Medical Office Work & Secretary Course
 Welfare General Course
 Graduate School of Social Welfare / Course of Social Welfare Management

Domestic exchange 
 Maebashi Institute of Technology

International exchanges 
 University of Regina
 King's University College (University of Western Ontario)
 Arellano University
 Beijing Social Administration Vocational College
 University of Thanhdong Vietnam

References

External links
 Official website 
 Official website 

Educational institutions established in the 15th century
Private universities and colleges in Japan
Universities and colleges in Gunma Prefecture
Maebashi